There have been several Battles of Buda in history:
 Siege of Buda (1529)
 Siege of Buda (1530)
 Siege of Buda (1541), capture of the city of Buda by the Turkish Ottoman Emperor Suleiman the Magnificent, as he invaded central Hungary
 Siege of Pest, an attempt to recapture Buda from the Turks
 Siege of Buda (1684), a battle when an Austrian army tried to take Buda from Ottoman Turkey
 Siege of Buda (1686), a battle when the Holy League took Buda from Ottoman Turkey
 Siege of Buda (1849), a battle during the Hungarian Revolution of 1848–49
 Siege of Budapest, capture of Budapest by the Soviet Union